Patelloida saccharina, common name the broad-ribbed limpet, is a species of sea snail, a true limpet, a marine gastropod mollusk in the family Lottiidae, one of the families of true limpets.

Subspecies
 Patelloida saccharina lanx (Reeve, 1855)
 Patelloida saccharina stella (Lesson, 1831)

Description
The size of the shell varies between 15 mm and 50 mm.

Distribution
This species occurs in the Red Sea, off Tanzania and Madagascar; off Japan and Australia (Northern Territory, Queensland, Western Australia)

References

 Allan, J.K. 1950. Australian Shells: with related animals living in the sea, in freshwater and on the land. Melbourne : Georgian House xix, 470 pp., 45 pls, 112 text figs. 
 Wilson, B. 2002. A handbook to Australian seashells on seashores east to west and north to south. Sydney : Reed New Holland 185 pp.
 Nakano T. & Ozawa T. (2007). Worldwide phylogeography of limpets of the order Patellogastropoda: molecular, morphological and paleontological evidence. Journal of Molluscan Studies 73(1): 79–99

External links
 

Lottiidae
Gastropods described in 1758
Taxa named by Carl Linnaeus